Tercera División de Chile (Third Division of Chile), is the fourth tier of Chilean football (soccer). It is organized by the Federación de Fútbol de Chile and the Asociación Nacional de Fútbol Amateur de Chile. It is both the fourth level of the Chilean football league system and the top league for Chilean Football Youth Leagues.

Overview 
In 1979, a commission to study applications for a Third Division amateur league was created by the Federación de Fútbol de Chile. 25 teams throughout the country participated on the first edition of the league in 1981. Since 1997, only players below 23 years are allowed to participate.

In 2023, 16 teams are going to play the league. The winner and the runner-up of the league get promoted to Segunda División.

League rules

Matchday squads in the Tercera División must include only players under the age of 23.

Current teams

These are the teams participating in the Chilean Tercera División, season 2023:

Tercera División champions

As third level of the Chilean League system

As fourth level of the Chilean League system

Titles by Team

Tercera División Cup champions

Official knock-out competition open to the clubs in the two lower divisions of the Chilean football league system, only played some seasons. The winners gets bonification points for the league tournament.

Notes and references

External links
 Official website

4
Fourth level football leagues of South America